Sofian Akouili (born 28 February 1989 in Nador) is a Dutch-Morocco professional footballer who plays as a centre back for OFC Oostzaan.

Club career
He came through the Heerenveen youth system and formerly played for FC Emmen and Willem II and joined Volendam in summer 2014.

References

External links
 Voetbal International profile 
 
 

1989 births
Living people
People from Nador
Moroccan emigrants to the Netherlands
Association football central defenders
Dutch footballers
Dutch expatriate footballers
FC Emmen players
Willem II (football club) players
FC Volendam players
Chabab Rif Al Hoceima players
MC Oujda players
Eredivisie players
Eerste Divisie players
Derde Divisie players
Botola players
Dutch expatriate sportspeople in Kazakhstan
Expatriate footballers in Kazakhstan
OFC Oostzaan players